Jean Marie may refer to:

 Jean Marie Antoine de Lanessan (1843–1919), French statesman and naturalist
 Jean Marie Balland (1934–1998), Roman Catholic Cardinal and Archbishop of Lyon
 Jean Marie Chérestal, prime minister of Haïti
 Jean Marie Higiro (born c. 1945), head of television and radio broadcasting in the Republic of Rwanda
 Jean Marie Marcelin Gilibert (19th century), French Commissioner in the French Gendarmerie
 Jean Marie Pardessus (1772–1853), French lawyer
 Jean Marie Stine (born 1945), American editor, writer, anthologist, and publisher
Jean Marie (DJ), Italian DJ and producer

See also
 Jean Marie River
 Jean-Marie
 , a number of steamships with this name